Oxystelma esculentum  is a species of flowering plant native to China, South Asia, southeast Asia, northeastern Africa, and south-west Asia. The plant is used in traditional medicine and the fruit is eaten.

References

Asclepiadoideae